"The Tape" is the 25th episode of Seinfeld. It is the eighth episode of the show's third season. It first aired on November 13, 1991.

The episode was written by Larry David and Don McEnery and Bob Shaw and was directed by David Steinberg. In this episode, Elaine leaves an erotic message on a tape recorder as a prank, inadvertently causing George to harbor a secret crush on her.

Plot
As a spontaneous prank, Elaine anonymously leaves an erotic message on Jerry's tape recorder that he used to record his comedy act from the previous night. Upon hearing the message, he becomes obsessed with it. Elaine tells George that she was the sexy voice in the tape. George is shocked to hear this and becomes attracted to her, but does not tell Elaine about it. Elaine makes George promise not to spoil the prank. Jerry, determined to get in touch with the woman who left the message, finds out who sat near the tape and gets her number. After his date with her, he tries to kiss her, but gets the "pull-back", and concludes that she is crazy.

At Jerry's apartment, George calls a company in Beijing to order a cream for treating baldness. The people on the other side of the line don't speak English. Elaine stops by and Kramer starts making home videos in Jerry's apartment. He livens things up by introducing Elaine and George as the leads in a new pornographic film, and mock interviewing them. Playing along, Elaine says the sex scenes with George are authentic, arousing him. A Chinese delivery boy, Ping, delivers the take-out Kramer ordered. George convinces Ping to act as a translator between him and the Beijing company.

George finds it hard to control his obsession with Elaine and confides in Jerry. When Jerry presses him to explain this sudden attraction, he eventually cracks and tells Jerry that Elaine left the message. She comes in later and tells her secret to Jerry, but Jerry says George already told him. George confesses his attraction to Elaine. She finds this news disturbing and then realizes that Jerry and Kramer have become attracted to her too. Freaked out, Elaine leaves Jerry's apartment. Once she is gone, the three fight to hear the tape again.

Production
This episode is the first appearance of Ping, the delivery boy who would return in the later episodes "The Visa", "The Virgin" and "The Pilot".

Use in scientific research
The Simpsons "Bart the General" and Seinfeld's "The Tape" were used in a Dartmouth College experiment to  study brain activity in relation to humorous moments in television shows. The results were published in a 2004 issue of the academic journal Neurolmage. The researchers noted, "During moments of humor detection, significant [brain] activation was noted in the left posterior middle temporal gyrus ... and left inferior frontal gyrus."

References

External links 
 

1991 American television episodes
Seinfeld (season 3) episodes
Television episodes written by Larry David